WOW 1998 is a compilation album of 30 contemporary Christian music hits which was released on November 4, 1997.  WOW 1998 peaked at chart position 52 on the Billboard 200 in 1997, and also at No. 2 on the Top Contemporary Christian album chart.  The album was certified platinum by the Recording Industry Association of America (RIAA) in 1998.  It was certified as gold in Canada in 1999 by the Canadian Recording Industry Association

Track listing

Disc one (Red)
"Overjoyed" – Jars of Clay
"Colored People" – dc Talk
"Hope to Carry On" – Caedmon's Call
"Abba (Father)" – Rebecca St. James
"My Hope Is You" – Third Day
"Missing Person" – Michael W. Smith
"Man of God" – Audio Adrenaline
"Disappear" – Out of the Grey
"Mission 3:16" – Carman
"Reality" – Newsboys
"We Can Make a Difference" – Jaci Velasquez
"People Get Ready... Jesus Is Comin'" – Crystal Lewis
"Saving the World" – Clay Crosse
"We Need Jesus" – Petra
"More Than You Know" – Out of Eden

Disc two (Black)
"Let Us Pray" – Steven Curtis Chapman
"Circle of Friends" – Point of Grace
"On My Way to Paradise" – Bob Carlisle
"Carry You" – Amy Grant (previously unreleased track from Behind the Eyes)
"The Measure of a Man" – 4Him
"Give It Up" – Avalon
"I Call Him Love" – Kathy Troccoli
"Adore You" – Anointed
"Just One" – Phillips, Craig and Dean
"Up Where We Belong" – BeBe & CeCe Winans
"You Move Me" – Susan Ashton
"Breathe On Me" – Sandi Patty
"One of Two" – Gary Chapman
"A Whisper Heard Around the World" – Bryan Duncan
"My Utmost for His Highest" – Twila Paris

References

External links 
 WOW Hits online

1997 compilation albums
1998